Kokonoe may refer to:

People with the given name
, Japanese actress and singer
Chiyotaikai Ryūji, head coach of the stable, known as Kokonoe Oyakata

Fictional characters
Kokonoe, a fictional character from BlazBlue
Rin Kokonoe, a fictional character from Kodomo no Jikan

Places
Kokonoe Station, is a passenger railway station
Kokonoe, Ōita, a town in Ōita Prefecture, Japan
Kokonoe stable, a stable of sumo wrestlers

Japanese-language surnames